This is a list of notable Native Americans from peoples indigenous to the contemporary United States, including Native Alaskans, Native Hawaiians, and Native Americans in the United States. Native American identity is a complex and contested issue. The Bureau of Indian Affairs defines Native American as having American Indian or Alaska Native ancestry. Legally, being Native American is defined as being enrolled in a federally recognized tribe or Alaskan village. Ethnologically, factors such as culture, history, language, religion, and familial kinships can influence Native American identity. All individuals on this list should have Native American ancestry. Historical figures might predate tribal enrollment practices and would be included based on ethnological tribal membership,

Artists

Elsie Allen, Cloverdale Pomo basketweaver
Marcus Amerman, Choctaw Nation of Oklahoma multimedia artist
Annie Antone, Tohono O'odham basketweaver
Spencer Asah, Kiowa artist
James Auchiah, Kiowa artist
Martha Berry, Cherokee Nation beadwork artist
Kelly Church, (Pottawatomi/Odawa/Ojibwe) basket maker, painter, and educator
Amanda Crowe, Eastern Band Cherokee woodcarver and educator
Dennis Cusick, Tuscarora painter, ca. 1800–1824
L. Frank, (Tongva, Ajachmem) artist, tribal scholar, writer and activist
Juanita Growing Thunder Fogarty, Fort Peck Assiniboine and Sioux quillworker and beadwork artist
Edmonia Lewis, African-American/Mississauga Ojibwe-descendent sculptor
 Litefoot, Cherokee Nation actor, hip hop artist
María Martínez, San Ildefonso Pueblo potter
 Nampeyo, Hopi-Tewa potter
Nora Naranjo-Morse, Santa Clara Pueblo artist
 Jeri Redcorn, Caddo/Potawatomi b. ca. 1940) potter
 Lawney Reyes, Confederated Colville Tribes (Sinixt) artist, author, and curator
Carol Lee Sanchez, Laguna Pueblo author and artist
Gail Tremblay, Micmac/Onondaga artist

Chiefs and other leaders
Ahaya (ca. 1710 – 1783), first recorded chief of the Alachua band of the Seminole tribe. 
Attakullakulla, Cherokee chief
Awashonks, Sakonnet 17th century female chief
Bill John Baker, Principal Chief of the Cherokee Nation
Black Hawk, Sauk chief
Black Kettle, Cheyenne chief
Andrew Blackbird, Odawa leader, historian, and author
Kimberly M. Blaeser, (Chippewa, Anishinaabe) author and poet
Elias Boudinot, Cherokee leader, journalist and publisher
Billy Bowlegs, Seminole chief
Joseph Brant, Mohawk leader
Carlos (Calusa) (died 1567), king of the Calusa people of Southwest Florida
Canonicus, Narragansett chief
Chief Gall, (Hunkpapa Lakota) chief
Cochise, Chiricahua Apache chief
Colorow, Ute chief 
Cornplanter, Seneca chief and diplomat
Crazy Horse, Oglala Lakota chief
Cuerno Verde, Spanish name for Tavibo Naritgant, a leader of the Comanche, likely of the Kotsoteka Comanche, in the late 18th century.
Logan Fontenelle, Omaha chief and interpreter
Geronimo, Chiricahua Apache leader
Captain Jack, Modoc chief
Red Jacket, Seneca Nation chief
Overton James, Chickasaw, educator, former Governor of the Chickasaw Nation
Chief Joseph, Nez Percé chief, war leader, and humanitarian
Juanillo, chief of the Guale Nchiefdom
Betty Mae Tiger Jumper, first female chief of the Seminole Tribe of Florida, also a publisher
Hiawatha, Onondaga-Mohawk chief was credited as the founder of the Iroquois confederacy
John Horse, African-American leader of the Black Seminole.
David Hill (Mohawk), Mohawk chief during the American Revolution
Keokuk, (Sac, Fox) chief
King Hagler, Catawba chief
Little Turkey was First Beloved Man of the Cherokee people, becoming the first Principal Chief of a united Cherokee Nation in 1794
Little Turtle, Miami chief
Lone Wolf the Elder, Kiowa chief
Lone Wolf the Younger, Kiowa leader
Major Ridge, Cherokee chief, led Lighthorse Patrol and signed the Treaty of New Echota.
Mangas Coloradas, Apache chief
Wilma Mankiller, Cherokee Nation chief
Manuelito, Navajo chief, diplomat, and warrior.
Massasoit, Wampanoag chief
Alexander McGillivray, Muscogee Creek Nation chief
William McIntosh, Muscogee Creek Nation chief
Peter McQueen, Muscogee Creek Nation chief, prophet, trader and warrior from Talisi (Tallassee, among the Upper Towns in present-day Alabama).
Metacomet, Wampanoag chief
Miantonomo, Narragansett chief
Olotoraca (1548–1573), subchief of a tribe of Fort San Mateo, Florida.
Oratam, sachem of the Hackensack Indians
Osceola, Seminole leader
Chief Oshkosh, Menominee leader
Chief Ouray, Ute Tribe leader
Opechancanough, Pamunkey chief
Quanah Parker, Comanche chief
Pawhuska, Osage Chief
Thomas Perryman, Creek leader in Georgia
Peter Chartier, Pekowi chief
Powhatan, Pamunkey chief
Chief Pontiac, Odawa chief
Red Cloud, Oglala Lakota chief
Chief G. Anne Richardson (Chief of the Rappahannock tribe - first female chief in Virginia since the 18th century)
Qualchan, 19th-century Yakama chief
John Ross, Cherokee chief
Juan Sabeata, Jumano chief
Greg Sarris, Federated Indians of Graton Rancheria tribal chairman, author, and professor
Sitting Bull, Hunkpapa Lakota chief
Chad Smith, former Principal Chief of Cherokee Nation
Samoset (1590–1653), first indigenous American chief to contact the Pilgrims in Plymouth, Massachusetts (March 16, 1621)
Smohalla, Wanapum chief and religious leader
Saturiwa, chief of the Saturiwa (a Mocama tribe of Timucua people, located in St. Johns River in Florida), during the 16th century
Chief Seattle, Suquamish leader
Standing Bear, Ponca chief
Touch the Clouds, (Mahpia Icahtagya), Teton Lakota chief
Tuskaloosa, paramount chief of a Mississippian chiefdom in Alabama
Uncas, Mohegan chief
Victorio, Chiricahua Apache chief
Weetamoo, Pocasset, 17th century female chief
White Plume, Kaw chief
Yellow Bird, Walla Walla chief
Yonaguska, Cherokee chief
William Weatherford, Muscogee Creek chief
White Hair (Pawhuska), the name of several Osage chiefs

Warriors and military
 Chainbreaker, Seneca war chief
 Roy Benavidez, (Yaqui), decorated U.S. Army Master sergeant and Medal of Honor recipient
 Running Eagle, (Blackfoot), war chief
 Ira Hayes, (Pima) one of five Marines, along with a United States Navy corpsman, immortalized in the iconic photograph of the flag raising on Iwo Jima
 John Horse (Black Seminole), warrior in the Second Seminole War in Florida
 Kilma S. Lattin, (Pala Band of Mission Indians), decorated U.S. Army former First Lieutenant and Soldiers Medal recipient
 Clayton J. Lonetree, Winnebago/Navajo U.S. Marine and convicted KGB spy
 Louis Gonzaga Mendez, Jr., highly decorated WWII United States Army officer of the 82nd Airborne Division
 Ely S. Parker, (Seneca) U.S. Army Brigadier General
 Lori Piestewa, Hopi veteran, died in the 2003 invasion of Iraq
 Popé, Ohkay Owingeh religious and military leader
 Santa Anna (Comanche war chief)
 Sonuk Mikko, Seminole, Captain in the Indian Home Guard during the American Civil War often referred to as Billy Bowlegs
 Tecumseh, Shawnee warrior and statesman
 William Clyde Thompson, Texas Choctaw leader who fought against the Dawes Commission for Choctaw enrollment
 Luis Tupatu, Pueblo leader of the northern pueblos following the Pueblo revolt
 Nancy Ward, Cherokee warrior, diplomat, and "Beloved Woman"
 Washakie, Shoshone warrior, diplomat, chief, leader
 Stand Watie, Cherokee leader and a brigadier general of the Confederate States Army during the American Civil War
 John Watts (also known as Young Tassel), a leader of the Chickamauga Cherokee (or "Lower Cherokee") during the Cherokee-American wars
 Dragging Canoe, Cherokee war chief
 Pushmataha, Choctaw chief and U.S. Army Brigadier General
 José Naranjo (Santa Clara Pueblo), warrior who fought in the Spanish troops against the Apaches and participated in the Villasur expedition

Politicians

Bill Anoatubby, (Chickasaw Nation), Governor of the Chicksaw Nation since 1987
Diane E. Benson, (Tlingit) politician, inspirational speaker, poet and author
Lisa Johnson Billy, Chickasaw Nation, Oklahoma State Legislator and Chickasaw Tribal Legislator
Ada E. Brown, Choctaw Nation, Federal Judge in the United States District Court for the Northern District of Texas
Ben Nighthorse Campbell, Northern Cheyenne chief, U.S. Representative, U.S. Senator, and silversmith
Brad Carson, Cherokee Nation, former Democratic U.S. congressman from Oklahoma
Holmes Colbert, Chickasaw government official
Tom Cole, Chickasaw Nation, Congressman from Oklahoma
Charles Curtis, (Kaw/Osage/Potawatomi) U.S. Senator and 31st Vice President of the United States
Sharice Davids, Ho-Chunk, U.S. Representative from Kansas
Affie Burnside Ellis, Navajo, first Native American to serve in the Wyoming Senate
Deb Haaland, Laguna Pueblo, U.S. Representative from New Mexico, 54th United States Secretary of the Interior
Diane Humetewa, Hopi, Judge of the United States District Court for the District of Arizona, former U.S. Attorney for the District of Arizona
Enoch Kelly Haney (Seminole Nation of Oklahoma), tribal leader, Oklahoma state legislator, and artist
Keith Harper, Cherokee Nation of Oklahoma, U.S. representative to the United Nations Human Rights Council in Geneva
Larry Echo Hawk, Pawnee Nation, former Democratic Attorney General of Idaho and former United States Assistant Secretary of the Interior for Indian Affairs
Yvette Herrell, Cherokee Nation, Congresswoman from New Mexico
Chuck Hoskin, Cherokee Nation, member of the Oklahoma House of Representatives from the 6th district
Shane Jett, Cherokee Nation, member of the Oklahoma Senate from the 17th district
Myron Lizer, Navajo / Comanche, Vice President of the Navajo Nation 
Byron Mallott (Tlingit), former Lieutenant Governor of Alaska
Green McCurtain Choctaw chief, Vice President of the Sequoyah Constitutional Convention
David T. McCoy, Turtle Mountain Chippewa state politician and attorney
Markwayne Mullin, Cherokee Nation, Congressman from Oklahoma
Mary Peltola, Yup'ik, Congresswoman from Alaska; first Alaska Native member of Congress, first woman to represent Alaska in the House, first representative from Alaska to have been born in the state
Ben Reifel, Brulé Lakota, activist and Congressman from South Dakota
Michael J. Stickman, Alaska Athabascan, first Chief of the Nuwato Tribal Council
Kimberly Teehee, Cherokee Nation, Democratic White House Senior Policy Advisor for Native American Affairs 
James Vann, Cherokee businessman and politician
Peterson Zah, Navajo politician
Andi LeBeau, Northern Arapaho from Wyoming

Religious leaders 
William Apess, (Pequot) Methodist minister
Black Elk, Oglala Lakota religious leader
Charles J. Chaput (Prairie Potawatomi), Roman Catholic bishop
Neolin, (Lenni Lenape) religious leader
George Tinker, Osage Nation theologian
Kennekuk, Kickapoo spiritual leader
Handsome Lake, Seneca religious leader
Samson Occom, Mohegan clergyman
St. David Pendleton Oakerhater, Southern Cheyenne warrior, artist, deacon, and saint in the Episcopal church
Oral Roberts, Choctaw Nation preacher
John Slocum, Squaxin Island Tribe, founder of the Indian Shaker Church
Kateri Tekakwitha, Mohawk/Algonquian convert, canonized saint in the Roman Catholic Church
Peter the Aleut (Unangax), also known as Cungagnaq, martyr and saint in some jurisdictions of the Eastern Orthodox Church.
Tenskwatawa, Shawnee religious leader
Wovoka, Paiute religious leader and founder of the Ghost Dance religion

Writers 

 Louise Abeita, Isleta Pueblo, 1926–2014
 Richard Aitson (Kiowa/Kiowa Apache, 1953–2022), beadwork artist and poet
 Sherman Alexie, Spokane, Coeur d'Alene novelist and comedian
 Paula Gunn Allen, Laguna Pueblo poet, literary critic, activist, and novelist
 William Apess (Pequot, 1798–1839), Methodist minister
 Annette Arkeketa, Otoe-Missouria/Muscogee
 Jim Barnes, Choctaw editor, author, poet and founder of the Chariton Review Press
 Gloria Bird, Spokane author
 Sherwin Bitsui, Navajo poet
 Ignatia Broker, White Earth Ojibwe author
 Gregory Cajete, Santa Clara Pueblo
 Elizabeth Cook-Lynn, Crow Creek Sioux author, poet, editor, and co-founder of the Wíčazo Ša Review
 David Cusick, Tuscarora illustrator and author, ca.1780–ca.1831
 Nora Marks Dauenhauer, Tlingit author and poet
 Philip J. Deloria, Standing Rock Sioux Tribe
 Ella Cara Deloria, Yankton Dakota/Standing Rock Sioux, 1889–1971
 Vine Deloria, Jr., Yankton Dakota/Standing Rock Sioux, 1933–2005
 Natalie Diaz, Mojave poet, language activist, former professional basketball player, and educator
 Michael Dorris, Modoc writer
 Heid E. Erdrich, Turtle Mountain Ojibwe writer and poet
 Louise Erdrich, Turtle Mountain Ojibwe writer and poet
 Janice Gould, Maidu writer
 Janet Campbell Hale, Coeur d'Alene/Ktunaxa/Cree writer
 Gordon Henry, White Earth Ojibwe writer
 Linda Hogan, Chickasaw Nation poet, storyteller, academic, environmentalist and writer.
 Joy Harjo, Muscogee Nation poet, musician, and author, US poet laureate
 Stephen Graham Jones, Blackfeet author
 Daniel Heath Justice, Cherokee Nation author
 Carole LaFavor, Ojibwe novelist and activist
 Layli Long Soldier, Oglala Lakota poet, writer, feminist, artist, and activist
 John Joseph Mathews, Osage author
 Deborah A. Miranda, Esselen/Chumash author and poet
 N. Scott Momaday, Kiowa poet, author, scholar, and painter
 Irvin Morris, Navajo author
 Mourning Dove, Syilx author, 1888–1936
 Cynthia Leitich Smith, Muscogee Creek author
 Tommy Orange, Cheyenne-Arapaho novelist and writer
 Simon J. Ortiz, Acoma Pueblo poet
 William S. Penn, Nez Perce author
 Robert L. Perea, Oglala Lakota novelist, educator, and veteran
 Susan Power, Standing Rock Nakota author
 Carter Revard, Osage Nation author and poet
 John Rollin Ridge, Cherokee author
 Wendy Rose, Hopi/Miwok author
 Jane Johnston Schoolcraft, Ojibwe author
 Leslie Marmon Silko, Laguna Pueblo poet and novelist
 James Thomas Stevens, Mohawk author and educator
 Margo Tamez, Lipan Apache/Jumano author and poet
 Luci Tapahonso, Diné poet
 David Treuer, Leech Lake Ojibwe author
 Mark Turcotte, Ojibwe author
 E. Donald Two-Rivers, Ojibwe poet and playwright
 Gerald Vizenor, White Earth Ojibwe writer and professor
 Velma Wallis, Athabaskan author 
 Anna Lee Walters, Pawnee/Otoe author
 James Welch, Blackfeet/Gros Ventre author and poet
 William S. Yellow Robe, Jr., Fort Peck Assiniboine, 1950–2021
 Ray Young Bear, Meskwaki author
 Ofelia Zepeda, Tohono O'odham poet and intellectual

Television and films

 Irene Bedard, Iñupiaq/Yupik/Cree/Métis actress, director, producer, activist
 Nathan Lee Chasing His Horse, Lakota actor
 Chris Eyre, Southern Cheyenne-Arapaho director and producer
 Kiowa Gordon, Hualapai actor
 Phil Lucas, Choctaw Nation of Oklahoma filmmaker, actor, writer, producer, director, and editor
 Russell Means, Oglala Lakota activist and actor
 Will Rogers, Cherokee actor and humorist
 Will Sampson, Muscogee Nation painter and actor
 Eddie Spears, Lakota actor
 Michael Spears, Lakota actor
 Luther Standing Bear, Oglala Lakota, author and actor
 Wes Studi, Cherokee Nation actor
 Sheila Tousey, Menominee actor
 Floyd Red Crow Westerman, Sisseton Dakota actor and musician

Musicians and singers

 Chuck Billy, Pomo singer for the thrash metal band, Testament
 Radmilla Cody, (Navajo) model, singer and activist
 Brent Michael Davids, Stockbridge Mohican composer and flutist
 R. Carlos Nakai, Navajo musician
 Supaman, Apsáalooke rapper
 Taboo (rapper), Shoshone-descent rapper and singer
 John Trudell, Santee Dakota, musician, poet, activist
 Frank Waln, Sicangu Lakota rapper

Sport

 Ron Baker, Citizen Potawatomi NBA player with the Washington Wizards
Notah Begay III, Navajo PGA Tour golfer
Johnny Bench, Choctaw Hall of Fame Catcher
Chief Bender, Ojibwa Hall of Fame pitcher
Sam Bradford, Cherokee Nation American football quarterback
Gerald Brisco, Chickasaw Nation Pro Wrestler and WWE talent scout
Jack Brisco, Chickasaw Nation Pro Wrestler, Former NWA World Champion
Ellison "Tarzan" Brown, Narragansett U.S. Olympian/Marathon Runner
Joba Chamberlain, Ho-Chunk pitcher for the Detroit Tigers
Chris Chavis, Lumbee professional wrestler
Rod Curl, (Wintu) PGA tour golfer
 Frank Dufina (Mackinac Bands of Chippewa and Ottawa Indians), professional golfer
Jacoby Ellsbury CRIT Navajo outfielder for the New York Yankees
 Angel Goodrich, (Cherokee Nation) WNBA basketball player
 Joe Guyon (Chippewa), American football halfback and baseball player. Won the NFL championship with the New York Giants in 1927. 
 Al Hoptowit (Yakama), American football player
 Bronson Koenig, Ho-Chunk basketball player currently on an NBA two-way contract
 Ashton Locklear Artistic Gymnast of Lumbee tribe. 2014 World Champion (Team), 2 x 2014 Pan American Champion (Team, Uneven Bars), 2 x 2016 Pacific Rim Champion (Team, Uneven Bars)
 Kyle Lohse, Nomlaki pitcher, Milwaukee Brewers
 Edward "Wahoo" McDaniel, Choctaw/Chickasaw professional wrestler
 Billy Mills, Oglala Lakota athlete 
 Anthony Seigler, Navajo, MLB player
 Shoni Schimmel, Confederated Tribes of the Umatilla Indian Reservation, WNBA player 
 Sonny Sixkiller, Cherokee Nation American football quarterback
 Louis Sockalexis (Penobscot), Major League Baseball player
 Jim Thorpe (Sac and Fox Nation), Olympic Gold medalist in track and field, gridiron football and baseball player
 Chris Wondolowski, (Kiowa), soccer player for the San Jose Earthquakes and United States national team
 Kerry Werner, (Kiowa), cyclist
 Lyle Thompson, (Onondaga), pro Lacrosse player

Activists 
 Anna Mae Aquash, Mi'kmaq. She participated in the American Indian Movement (AIM) in the Wounded Knee incident at the Pine Ridge Indian Reservation, United States in 1973.
 Dennis Banks, Leech Lake Ojibwe activist, teacher, lecturer, author and co-founder of the American Indian Movement
 Mary Brave Bird, Brulé Lakota activist. She was a member of the American Indian Movement during the 1970s and participated in some of their most publicized events.
 Clyde Bellecourt White Earth Ojibwe activist and co-founder of the American Indian Movement
 Carter Camp, Ponca activist
 Don Coyhis, Mohican, sobriety leader and mental health activist, lecturer and author. Founder of Wellbriety, a holistic approach that emphasizes community support for individuals as well as a return to cultural roots for Native American communities.
 Billy Frank Jr., Nisqually (deceased), environmental leader and treaty rights. He was the founder and chairman, Northwest Indian Fisheries Commission
 Winona LaDuke, White Earth Ojibwe  environmental activist and writer. She was known for her work on tribal land claims and preservation, as well as sustainable development.
 Susan LaFlesche Picotte, Omaha/Ponca/Iowa activist, first female Native American physician. She campaigned for public health and for the formal, legal allotment of land to members of the Omaha tribe. 
 Susette LaFlesche Tibbles, Omaha/Ponca/Iowa spokesperson for Native American rights
 Katherine Smith, (Navajo) activist and defender of Navajo lands
 Betty Osceola, Miccosukee educator, conservationist, anti-fracking, and clean water advocate in the Florida Everglades
 Deborah Parker (Tulalip, born 1970), activist and Tulalip Tribes vice-chairwoman from 2012 to 2015 Parker campaigned for the reauthorization and for the inclusion of provisions which gave tribal courts jurisdiction over violent crimes against women and families involving non–Native Americans on tribal lands.
Leonard Peltier, Turtle Mountain Chippewa/Lakota activist. A member of the American Indian Movement (AIM), he is imprisoned for first-degree murder for the shooting of two Federal Bureau of Investigation (FBI) agents during a 1975 conflict on the Pine Ridge Indian Reservation
Elizabeth Peratrovich, Tlingit civil rights activist. Peratrovich and her husband were instrumental in the successful Alaska Native Sisterhood and Alaska Native Brotherhood campaign against racial discrimination in Alaska, culminating in the 1945 enactment of the Anti-Discrimination Act.
Lawrence Plamondon, Grand Traverse Odawa/Ojibwe activist and storyteller. He helped found the White Panther Party. He was the first hippie to be listed on the FBI's Ten Most Wanted Fugitives list. Plamondon's father was half-Odawa and his mother was part-Ojibwe.
D'Arcy McNickle, Salish Kootenai author, activist, and anthropologist
Zitkala-Sa, Yankton Dakota writer and activist. She was co-founder of the National Council of American Indians, supporting Native civil rights. In addition, she served as its president until her death in 1938. She wrote several books about the Native American cultures and is one of the most influential Native American activists of the twentieth century. 
Simon Pokagon, Potawatomi author and Native American advocate. 
Leopold Pokagon, Potawatomi storyteller and activist. He tried to protect and promote the Potawatomi communities living in the St. Joseph River Valley and their lands.
 Luana Reyes, Confederated Colville Tribes (Sinixt) health activist and educator, 1933–2001
Sarah Winnemucca, Paiute advocate for the rights of Native Americans and served US forces as a messenger, interpreter, and guide, and as a teacher for imprisoned Native Americans. She also wrote the "first known autobiography written by a Native American woman."

Linguists and interpreters 
 Jessie Little Doe Baird (born 1963), Wampanoag linguist and preserver of the Massachusett language
 Hobomok, Wampanoag interpreter
 Don Luis (died 1571), Kiskiack or Paspahegh guide and interpreter for a party of Jesuit missionaries in Virginia 
 Joseph James and Joseph James, Jr., Kaw/Osage interpreters and guides
 Toby Riddle (1848–1920), Modoc interpreter and diplomat
 Sacajawea, Shoshone interpreter
 John Sassamon, Massachusett, interpreter
 Sequoyah (Cherokee), inventor of the Cherokee syllabary
 Squanto (c. 1585–November 1622), also known as Tisquantum, last surviving Patuxet, interpreter for the Pilgrims in Plymouth, Massachusetts

Journalists and columnists 
Charlie LeDuff, Sault Ste. Marie Chippewa journalist, writer, and media personality
Rob Capriccioso, Sault Ste. Marie Tribe of Chippewa Indians, journalist and writer
Terri Crawford Hansen, Ho-Chunk/Potawatomi journalist, and author
John Christian Hopkins, Narragansett people Journalist, Author.
Jim Northrup, Fond du Lac Ojibwe columnist and political writer
Willie Ottogary, Northwestern Shoshone journalist and leader.
 Will Rogers, Jr., Cherokee Nation journalist and politician
Mark Trahant, Shoshone-Bannock, print and broadcast journalist, and author

Academics
Buffalo Bird Woman, Hidatsa woman
 Gregory Cajete, Santa Clara Pueblo ethnobotanist, author, and educator
Ishi, Yana educator and last member of his tribe
Francis LaFlesche, Omaha/Ponca/Iowa ethnologist and author
 Robert J. Conley, Cherokee author
Vine Deloria, Jr., Yankton Dakota/Standing Rock Nakota theologian, historian, writer and activist
Charles Eastman, Santee Dakota author, physician and helped found the Boy Scouts of America.
LeAnne Howe, Choctaw Nation of Oklahoma author and scholar
Joseph Marshall III, Lakota educator and author
Devon A. Mihesuah, Choctaw Nation historian, author, and editor
Joe Medicine Crow, Crow Nation anthropologist
Nila NorthSun, Shoshone/Ojibwe author and historian
 Luana Ross, Confederated Salish and Kootenai Tribes sociologist and author
 Delphine Red Shirt, Oglala writer and chair of OCIDWIP at the United Nations
Richard Twiss, Brulé Lakota educator and author

Scientists 
 Fred Begay, Navajo nuclear physicist
 Karletta Chief, Navajo soil scientist
 Kathleen R. Johnson, Grand Traverse Band of Ottawa and Chippewa Indians, paleoclimatologist
 Mary G. Ross, Cherokee Nation engineer
 Krystal Tsosie, Navajo geneticist and bioethicist
 Maria Yellow Horse Brave Heart, Hunkpapa/Oglala Lakota social scientist who developed the concept of historical trauma

Other
George Bent, Cheyenne, soldier, warrior, interpreter, and cultural informant
Polly Cooper, Oneida Tribe aid to the Continental Army during the American Revolution at Valley Forge
Jesse Cornplanter, Seneca author and artist
Leonard Crow Dog, Sicangu Lakota medicine man, activist, and author
Pierre Cruzatte, Omaha member of the Lewis and Clark Expedition.
 Deganawida (Haudenosaunee), founder of the Iroquois Confederacy, more respectfully called The Great Peacemaker
Larry EchoHawk, Pawnee head of the BIA, former Attorney General of Idaho
John Herrington, Chickasaw Nation NASA astronaut
James and Ernie, Navajo comedy duo
Maude Kegg, Mille Lacs Ojibwe writer, folk artist, and cultural interpreter
Mountain Wolf Woman, Ho-Chunk autobiographer
Owl Woman, Cheyenne negotiator, peacemaker, Colorado Women's Hall of Fame
Pocahontas, aka Matoaka, Powhatan mediator with the earliest colonists in Jamestown
 Rattling Blanket Woman (Miniconjou), mother of Crazy Horse
Paul Chaat Smith, Comanche/Choctaw, writer, Associate Curator of the National Museum of the American Indian
Maria Tallchief, Osage Nation ballerina
Marjorie Tallchief, Osage Nation ballerina
Randy'L He-dow Teton, Shoshone-Bannock, model for the US Sacagawea dollar
Tsali, Eastern Cherokee warrior, chief, and martyr

See also
 List of Principal Chiefs of the Cherokee
 Leading chief of the Seminoles
 List of Lumbees
 American Indians of Iowa
 List of Native American artists from Oklahoma
 List of Native American leaders of the Indian Wars
 List of Native American Medal of Honor recipients
 List of Native American temperance activists
 List of Native American women of the United States
Category: Native American scientists
List of indigenous artists of the Americas
List of writers from peoples indigenous to the Americas

References

Lists of Native American people
Native